Below is a list of mayors of the town of Grimsby in the English ceremonial county of Lincolnshire.

The first recorded Mayor of Grimsby was in 1201. After 1835 the mayoral year usually began in November, although after 1949 it sometimes began in April or in May.

The position became extinct in 1996 when Grimsby was merged with Cleethorpes to form the North East Lincolnshire Unitary Authority.

Mayors of Grimsby

1392-3: Robert Burton
1400-2: Simon Grimsby, MP for Grimsby
1521 Willelmus Hattecliffe
1576: Thomas Moryson, MP
1582 Chris.Hattecliffe
1584 Johannes Hattecliffe
1596. Johannes Hattecliffe
1635: William Booth
1636: Gervase Holles, MP  
1638: Gervase Holles, MP
1639: William Booth
1663: Gervase Holles, MP
1669: Frescheville Holles, MP 
1835, Bransby Harrisson
1836, Thomas Bell
1837, William Brooks
1838, John Manton (retired)
1838, Thomas Bell
1839, William Bennett
1840, William Bennett
1841, Bransby Harrisson
1842, John Nicholson
1843, John Nicholson
1844, William Brooks
1845, William Brooks
1846, Thomas Bell
1847, William Heaford Daubney
1848, W. H. Daubney
1849, John Wintringham
1850, John Wintringham
1851, W. H. Daubney
1852, W. H. Daubney
1853, Robert Keetley
1854, Robert Keetley
1855, Charles Batholomew Moody
1856, C.B.Moody
1857, John Bell
1858, John Bell
1859, William Brooks
1860, Hildyard Marshall Leppington
1861, H.M.Leppington
1862, Henry Bennett
1863, Henry Bennett
1864, John Wintringham
1865, John Wintringham
1866, Thomas Oates
1867, Thomas Oates
1868, Edward John Bannister
1869, Edward John Bannister

1870, William Thomas Wintringham
1871, W. T. Wintringham
1872, James Reed
1873, James Reed
1874, John Wintringham
1875, Thomas Charlton
1876, Thomas Charlton
1877, Henry James Veal
1878, Henry James Veal
1879, Henry Bennett
1880, Henry Bennett
1881, William Jackson
1882, William Jackson
1883, Thomas Bell Keetley
1884, Thomas Bell Keetley
1885, Henry Smethurst, senior
1886, Henry Smethurst, senior
1887, Henry James Veal
1888, Henry James Veal
1889, Henry Bennett
1890, Henry Bennett
1891, George Shelton Dobson
1892, George Doughty
1893, George Doughty
1894, Enoch Palmer
1895, Enoch Palmer
1896, Jack Sutcliffe
1897, Jack Sutcliffe
1898, William Southworth
1899, William Southworth
1900, Harrison Mudd
1901, Moses Abrahams
1902, Francis Evison
1903, Anthony Bannister
1904, Joseph Hewson
1905, Frederick William Riggall
1906, Jacob Pickwell
1907, Thomas George Tickler
1908, Frank Barrett
1909, Robert William Roberts
1910, James Whitley Wilkin
1911, Alfred John Knott
1912, Christopher Miller
1913, John Herbert Tate
1914, James William Eason
1915, Thomas Campbell Moss
1916, Joseph Barker
1917, Frederick Moss
1918, Frederick Moss
1919, John William Hobbs
1920, Franklin Thornton
1921, Joseph Henry Curry
1922, Walter James Womersley
1923, Richard Guy Kitching
1924, Frank Barrett
1925, Ernest Harrison
1926, Leslie Kingsford Osmond
1927, Leslie Kingsford Osmond
1928, Malcolm Guy Smith
1929, Isidore Abrahams
1930, Alfred John Knott
1931, Charles William Dixon
1932, Thomas Newby
1933, Cornelius Canning
1934, John Hogg
1935, John Wales Prior
1936, Thomas Sylvester Stone
1937, Charles Edwin Franklin
1938, Henry Weldrick
1939, John Joseph Sutton
1940, Charles Henry Wilkinson
1941, James Keay
1942, Edward Shaw Rudkin
1943, Max Bloom
1944, Charles William Hewson
1945, William Roberts
1946, John William Lancaster
1947, William Banks Bailey
1949, (May) Margaret Larmour
1950, William Henry Windley
1951, John Ashcroft Webster
1952, George Cedric Wilson
1953, George Herbert Atkinson
1954, Wilfred Harris
1955, John Cornelius Bernard Olsen
1956, (April) Wilfred Harris
1956, (May) Matthew Quinn
1957, John Henry Franklin
1958, Matthew Larmour
1959, Fred Goodfellow Gardner
1960, Reginald Swan Haylett
1961, George Herbert Pearson
1962, Elias William Marshall
1963, Cyril James Moody
1964, Jean Baxter Baillie McLaren
1965, Denys Eugene Petchell
1966, William James Molson
1967, Alfred Henry Chatteris
1968, Thomas Walter Sleeman
1969, Alfred Cyril Parker
1970, William Ernest Wilkins
1971, Lilian Trayer
1972, Florence Elizabeth Franklin
1973, Margaret E. Darley
1974, (Apr) Matthew Quinn
1974, (Apr) Ivor Hanson
1975, Alfred Neilson
1976, Peter Ellis
1977, Peter Willing
1978, Marjorie Elliott
1979, Chesney Aubrey Brocklesby
1980, Walter Banyard Smith
1981, Roy Bannister Cheeseman
1982, Roy James Ellis
1983, Anthony Jack Rouse
1984, Alexander MackieWebster
1985, Anthony Frederick Coleman
1986, Pauline Frances Ellis
1987, David Charles Casswell
1988, Sarah Campbell Woodliff
1989, David Andrew Currie
1990, Helen Douglas Hooton
1991, Kathleen Phoebe Bell
1992, Noel Granville Perkins
1993, Stephen J. Norton
1994, Alec Bovill
1995, John B. Colebrook

References

Grimsby